Malbrán is a municipality and village in Santiago del Estero in Argentina.
 
It is a City Commission (art.209 "Organic Law of Municipalities No.: 5590) is currently the second most populous city department Aguirre (905 hab. Census 2001). Located just 30 km away from the nearby town of Pinto (head of department) which concentrates and commercial banking.

References

Populated places in Santiago del Estero Province